Person to Person! is the eighth album led by saxophonist Houston Person which was recorded in 1970 and released on the Prestige label.

Reception

Allmusic awarded the album 3 stars calling it "Soul-jazz that inclines more to the "soul" part of the compound than many such Prestige efforts of the time".

Track listing 
All compositions by Houston Person except as indicated
 "The Son of Man" (Harold Ousley) - 8:30   
 "Teardrops" (Bunny Biggs) - 4:35   
 "Close to You" (Burt Bacharach, Hal David) - 5:15   
 "Drown In My Own Tears" (Henry Glover) - 7:15   
 "Up At Joe's, Down At Jim's" - 8:45   
 "Yester-Me, Yester-You, Yesterday" (Brian Wells, Ron Miller) - 4:30

Personnel 
Houston Person - tenor saxophone
Virgil Jones - trumpet 
Sonny Phillips - organ, electric piano (tracks 3 & 6)
Grant Green - guitar
Jimmy Lewis - electric bass
Idris Muhammad - drums
Buddy Caldwell - congas

References 

Houston Person albums
1970 albums
Prestige Records albums
Albums produced by Bob Porter (record producer)
Albums recorded at Van Gelder Studio